Following is a list of cannabis rights leaders, and activists in the cannabis legalization movement, including business leaders and celebrities who advocate for ending cannabis prohibition:

Cannabis rights leaders

Cannabis rights leaders, listed by country:

Argentina
 Matías Faray

Australia
 Richard Friar
 Nevil Schoenmakers
 Chillinit
Michael Balderstone

Canada
 Riley Cote
 Jodie Emery
 Marc Emery
 Grant Krieger
 Dana Larsen
 Blair Longley
 Ron Mann
 Marc-Boris St-Maurice
 Hugô St-Onge
 Brian Taylor
 John Turmel
 Val Venis

Germany
 Angela Gossow
 Georg Wurth

Hungary
 Juhász Péter

Ireland
 Luke "Ming" Flanagan

Israel
 Raphael Mechoulam

Jamaica
 Bob Marley
 Peter Tosh

Japan

 Saya Takagi
 Junichi Takayasu

Netherlands
 Frits Bolkestein
 Dries van Agt
 Herman George "Armand" van Loenhout
 Simon Vinkenoog

New Zealand
 Israel Adesanya
 Abe "Gandalf" Gray
 Shai Navot
 Chlöe Swarbrick
 Nándor Tánczos

Norway
 Thorvald Stoltenberg

South Africa
 Lee Harris

Spain
 Antonio Escohotado

Sweden
 Joar Forssell

United Kingdom
 Stephen Abrams
 Richard Branson
 Paul Flynn
 The Beatles
 Clare Hodges
 Norman Lamb
 Howard Marks
 Don Barry Mason
 Dean "Black the Ripper" West
 Kevin Williamson

United States

American cannabis rights leaders, listed by state:

Alabama
 Loretta Nall

Alaska
 Charlo Greene
 Irwin Ravin

Arizona
 Caroline Killeen
 Jake Plummer

Arkansas
 Joycelyn Elders

California
 Tom Ammiano
 Nicole Aniston
 Paul Armentano
 Ngaio Bealum
 Doug Benson
 Eddie Bravo
 Calvin "Snoop Dogg" Broadus Jr.
 Jay Cavanaugh
 Tommy Chong
 Chris Conrad
 Valerie Corral
 Steve DeAngelo
 Nate Diaz
 Nick Diaz
 Lowell Eggemeier
 Scott Feil
 Louis "B-Real" Freese
 Fred Gardner
 James Gray
 Al Harrington
 Jack Herer
 Jay Evan "Laganja Estranja" Jackson
 George Clayton Johnson
 Paul Kantner
 Paul Krassner
 Michael Krawitz
 Steve Kubby
 Kyle Kushman
 Barbara Lee
 Richard Lee
 Lucky Lehrer
 Charles C. Lynch
 Seth MacFarlane
 Allison Margolin
 Terence McKenna
 Jim McMahon
 Peter McWilliams
 Steve McWilliams
 Christine "Sister Kate" Meeusen
 Tod Mikuriya
 Mikki Norris
 Dennis Peron
 Michelle Phillips
 Mary Jane "Brownie Mary" Rathbun
 Rudy Reyes
 Seth Rogen
 Henry Rollins
 Ed Rosenthal
 Jerry Rubin
 Frank Shamrock
 Cheryl Shuman
 John Sperling
 Kyle Turley
 Marc Wasserman
 George Zimmer

Colorado
 William "Wayward Bill" Chengelis
 Krystal Gabel
 Rachel K. Gillette
 Ken Gorman
 Steven Hager
 Christian Hageseth
 Nate Jackson
 Wanda James
 Laura Kriho
 Sal Pace
 Jessica Peck
 Jared Polis
 Mason Tvert
 Brian Vicente
 Marvin Washington
 Jane West

Florida
 Steve Berke
 Eben Britton
 Mike James
 Norm Kent
 Peter B. Lewis
 John Morgan
 Robert Randall

Georgia
 Sanjay Gupta
 Cheryl Miller
 Asher Roth

Hawaii
 Roger Christie
 Woody Harrelson
 Andrew Simmons

Illinois
 Mezz Mezzrow
 Jim "Chef Ra" Wilson Jr.

Iowa
 George McMahon

Kansas
 Shona Banda

Kentucky
 Dan Jack Combs
 Gatewood Galbraith
 Dakota Meyer

Maryland
 Montel Williams
 Kevin Zeese

Massachusetts
 Constance Bumgarner Gee
 Jack A. Cole
 Greta Gaines
 Lester Grinspoon
 Daniel "Danny Danko" Vinkovetsky

Michigan
 Tom Crosslin
 John Sinclair

Minnesota
 John Birrenbach
 Jim Carlson
 Tim Davis
 James "Jesse Ventura" Janos
 Chris Wright

Nebraska
 Mark Elworth Jr.
 Donald Fiedler

New Hampshire
 Abdullah Saeed

New Jersey
 Cory Booker
 Edward "NJWeedman" Forchion
 David L. Nathan
 Ken Wolski

New Mexico
 Gary Johnson

New York
 Dana Beal
 Kristin M. Davis
 Jacqueline "Coca Crystal" Diamond
 Ann Druyan
 Abby Epstein
 Allen Ginsberg
 Gary "Tom Forçade" Goodson
 Abbie Hoffman
 Thomas K. Leighton
 Bill Maher
 Ethan Nadelmann
 Anthony Papa
 David Peel
 Carl Sagan
 Ed Sanders
 Larry Sharpe

Nevada
 Joseph N. Crowley

North Carolina
 Sean Haugh

Ohio
 John Boehner 
 Steve Conliff

Oregon
 Earl Blumenauer
 Madeline Martinez
 Elvy Musikka
 Clifford Robinson
 Malcom Gregory Scott
 Allen St. Pierre
 Paul Stanford
 George "Jorge Cervantes" Van Patten

Pennsylvania
 Gisele Fetterman
 Kiyoshi Kuromiya
 Maj Toure

South Dakota
 Alex White Plume

Tennessee
 Stephen Gaskin
 Derrick Morgan

Texas
 Barry Cooper
 Brian Cuban
 Joe Gaddy
 Larry Hagman
 Ann Lee
 Willie Nelson
 Joe Ptak
 Brett Stahl
 Jeffrey "Zeal" Stefanoff
 Mark Stepnoski

Vermont
 Cris Ericson

Virginia
 Arthur Kleps
 Eugene Monroe

Washington
 Alison Holcomb
 Vivian McPeak
 Norm Stamper
 Rick Steves
 Karen Stratton

Washington, D.C.
 Erik Altieri
 Richard Cowan
 Adam Eidinger
 George Farnham
 Rob Kampia
 Nikolas Schiller
 Keith Stroup
 William Creighton Woodward

West Virginia
 Jon Gettman

Wisconsin
 Ben Masel
 Jacki Rickert

See also
 List of cannabis rights organizations

Sources

External links
 Cannabis Culture Awards
 High Times 1999 Top 25 Living Legends of Pot
 History of NORML Awards (1998-2017)

Cannabis activists
 
Rights leaders
 
Lists of social activists